Enterprise information access refers to information systems that allow for enterprise search; content classification; content clustering; information extraction; enterprise bookmarking; taxonomy creation and management; information presentation (for example, visualization) to support analysis and understanding; and desktop or personal knowledge search.

See also
 Enterprise content management
 Intranet

References

 Gartner Forecast: Information Access and Search Technology in the Enterprise, 2006–2010. (17 February 2006). By Tom Eid, Gartner. Pages:6 

Information systems